A total of 36 teams contested the league divided into three groups, Lohko A (Group A), Lohko B (Group B) and Lohko C (Group C). 25 returning from the 2016 season, two relegated from Ykkönen and nine promoted from Kolmonen. The champion of each group and the best runner-up will qualify to promotion matches to decide which two teams get promoted to the Ykkönen. The bottom three teams in each group will qualify directly for relegation to Kolmonen. Each team will play a total of 22 matches, playing twice against each team of its group.

KTP and FC Jazz were relegated from the 2016 Ykkönen, while FC Honka and IF Gnistan were promoted to the 2017 Ykkönen.

Groups

Lohko A (Group A)

Lohko B (Group B)

Lohko C (Group C)

League tables

Lohko A (Group A)

Lohko B (Group B)

Lohko C (Group C)

Runner-up teams
At the end of the season, a comparison is made between the runners-up. The best runner-up will qualify to promotion matches.

Promotion play-offs
Group winners and the best runner-up will play two-legged ties. Team pairs will be drawn and the two winning teams will be promoted to the Ykkönen for season 2017.

Group winners

The best runner-up
Klubi 04

First leg

Second leg

AC Kajaani won 6–3 on aggregate.

Klubi 04 won 9–1 on aggregate.

References

Kakkonen seasons
3
Fin